Arcyosperma is a genus of flowering plants belonging to the family Brassicaceae.

Its native range is Pakistan to Himalaya.

Species:

Arcyosperma primulifolium

References

Brassicaceae
Brassicaceae genera